Gentlemen and Players is a British television series produced by TVS Television for the ITV network. An aspirational late 1980s drama series, Gentlemen and Players dealt with the struggles and intrigues involving two business rivals, Bo Beaufort and Mike Savage, set against a backdrop of high finance, opulent country homes and cricket.

Premise
Miles "Bo" Beaufort (Brian Protheroe) is a rich "blue blood" financier who comes from a wealthy upper-class family. Mike Savage (Nicholas Clay) is a self-made businessman from a more modest family background, who likes adventure. The two are old enemies, and when Savage returns from a stay in Africa (fleeing from a coup with a fortune in bonds), he chooses to settle with his wife Sandy (Claire Oberman) and daughters in the affluent Hampshire village of Hunton Magna, in a Georgian mansion that is next door to Beaufort's home. Unhappy about his new neighbour, especially when he joins his local cricket club, Beaufort schemes and uses the old boy network to hamper Savage's plans whenever possible. Rivalry between the two escalates as "old money" clashes with "new money".

Cast
Starring
Bo Beaufort - Brian Protheroe
Mike Savage - Nicholas Clay
Sandy Savage - Claire Oberman
Jane Somerville - Edita Brychta
Eleanor Beaufort - Faith Brook

Recurring cast
Paula Savage - Debra Beaumont
Kimberley Savage - Claudia Gambold
Liz Beaufort - Sara Griffiths
Kate Beaufort - Sadie Frost (Series 1 only)
Alex Castle - Osmund Bullock
Tom Fletcher - Leslie Schofield
Freddie Hall - Robert Ashby (Series 1 only)
Charles Neville - Terence Harvey
Sir Geoffrey Hinchcliffe - Nicholas Selby
PC Perkins - Lewis George
Jenny - Steffanie Pitt

Production and broadcast
Two series were made between 1988 and 1989, comprising 13 episodes in total, mostly filmed on location in London and Hampshire. The first series, comprising seven episodes, was screened on ITV on Sunday nights at 7.45pm from 10 April - 22 May 1988. The second series, comprising six episodes, moved to Friday nights at 9pm, and ran from 28 April - 9 June 1989.

The press release for the series by TVS Television described Gentlemen and Players as "A story of money, class and rivalry set in the world of finance and gracious country homes.", with The Guardian newspaper describing it as "a kind of Dallas in Hampshire".

Reception
Writing in The Guardian in 1989 (at the end of the second series), critic Nancy Banks-Smith mocked the "yards and yards and yards" of blue and white striped shirt material (a typical garment for 1980s banking and business culture) that many of the characters wear. "Everybody in Gentlemen and Players wore blue striped shirts to show they are something substantial in the city. It is as if the noble blood in their veins were showing through the clear white Caucasian of their skins." Commenting on the casting of the series' array of unscrupulous businessmen, she noted "...Every untrustworthy face in Equity was on parade. Some of whom had eyes that operated independently. One [character] had a deeply unreliable moustache."

Episode list

Series 1 (1988)

Series 2 (1989)

Theme song
The theme song played over the end credits, "Life's A Game", was written by David Lindup and performed by Petula Clark. Produced by Tony Britten, who also composed the incidental music for the series, the song was released as a single in 1988 by Fly Records.

Availability
There has been no domestic commercial release of Gentlemen and Players on any format in the UK. This is possibly due to ongoing rights issues after the production company, TVS, dropped out of the ITV network in 1992 and subsequently went through a number of take-overs. This problem affects the majority of the TVS programme archive as much of the original production paperwork and sales documentation has been lost during the intervening years.

References

External links
 

1980s British drama television series
1988 British television series debuts
1989 British television series endings
ITV television dramas
English-language television shows
Television shows produced by Television South (TVS)
Television shows set in London
Television shows set in Hampshire